Hikmet Baba oglu Nazarli (7 March 1966, Baku, Azerbaijan SSR - 26 February 1992, Khojaly, Azerbaijan) was a National Hero of Azerbaijan and warrior during the First Nagorno-Karabakh War.

Early life and education 
Nazarli was born on 7 March 1966 in Baku, Azerbaijan SSR. In 1973, he went to the Secondary School No. 27 in Xətai raion, and then moved to Tashkent because of his father's job. In 1982 he returned to Baku again. He was drafted to the Soviet Armed Forces in 1984. Nazarli did his military service in Georgia and was discharged from the army in 1986. He started to work at the Fire Protection Service of the Ministry of Internal Affairs of Azerbaijan.

Personal life 
Nazarli was married and had one child.

First Nagorno-Karabakh War 

When the First Nagorno-Karabakh War started, Nazarli voluntarily joined the Azerbaijani Armed Forces and went to the front-line. He participated in battles around the villages of Agdam District. 

On February 26 1992, during the Khojaly Massacre, Nazarli helped town inhabitants to evacuate from the city. After that battle, Nazarli and his friends moved towards the forests and since that time there is no information about any of them.

Honors 
Hikmet Baba oglu Nazarli was posthumously awarded the title of "National Hero of Azerbaijan" by Presidential Decree No. 178 dated 9 September 1992.

See also 
 First Nagorno-Karabakh War
 List of National Heroes of Azerbaijan

References

Sources 
Vugar Asgarov. Azərbaycanın Milli Qəhrəmanları (Yenidən işlənmiş II nəşr). Bakı: "Dərələyəz-M", 2010, səh. 230.

1966 births
1992 deaths
Military personnel from Baku
Azerbaijani military personnel of the Nagorno-Karabakh War
Azerbaijani military personnel killed in action
National Heroes of Azerbaijan
Victims of the Khojaly massacre